The Catalina Real-Time Transient Survey is a collaboration using three telescopes looking for optical transients.  The same telescopes are used as in the Catalina Sky Survey. They are Mt. Lemmon Survey, Catalina Sky Survey, and Siding Spring Survey.  When transients are detected they are alerted on a short time scale so that others can observe the event as well using  VOEventNet and SkyAlert.  It has detected supernovae, cataclysmic variables, blazars, active galactic nuclei and flares.

References

Astronomical surveys
Observational astronomy